Herminiimonas aquatilis is a bacterial species isolated from drinking water.

References

External links
Type strain of Herminiimonas aquatilis at BacDive -  the Bacterial Diversity Metadatabase

Burkholderiales
Bacteria described in 2005